Bedford Historic Meetinghouse, also known as Methodist Meetinghouse and St. Philip's Episcopal Church, is a historic meeting house located at 153 W. Main Street in Bedford, Virginia.   It was built in 1838, and is a brick building measuring 38 feet by 58 feet and in the Greek Revival style.  It features a shallow, pedimented gable roof topped by a square belfry with a stubby, tapered spire.  It was built as Bedford's first Methodist Church and houses the headquarters of the Bedford Historical Society.

It was listed on the National Register of Historic Places in 1978.

References

External links
Bedford Historical Society website
Bedford Meeting House, 153 West Main Street, Bedford, Bedford City, VA at the Historic American Buildings Survey (HABS)

Churches on the National Register of Historic Places in Virginia
Greek Revival church buildings in Virginia
Episcopal churches in Virginia
Methodist churches in Virginia
Churches completed in 1838
National Register of Historic Places in Bedford, Virginia
Historic American Buildings Survey in Virginia
19th-century Episcopal church buildings
1838 establishments in Virginia